Pattole Palame is a compilation of Kodava folksongs first published in 1924.

Contents

The book is of 556 pages and divided into six sections. The first is called the Kodagu vivarane (Description of Kodagu) and consists of the first 76 pages. It speaks mainly of Kodagu's history, mythical and political, and geography. The second section (pages 73–202) is called Kodavara paddathi (Kodava customs) which speak of the ceremonies in the life of a Kodava from birth until death. Habbagalu (pages 203-298) is the name of the third section and it speaks of the Kodava festivals. The fourth section Devatheyada Pattu, gods' songs, from pages 269-403, consists of the songs of the village gods and goddesses. Goddess Kaveri, Seven Gods, Five Gods, Three Gods, Two Gods, Sarthavu (Aiyappa), Ketrappa (Kshetrapala), Pudiyodi (Bhagwathi) and others were the gods to whom these songs were dedicated. Keli Ponada Pattu (Songs of the well-known) forms the fifth section, pages from 404 to 502. It consists of ballads dedicated to Kanniyada Kamayya (also known as a folk song of Seven goddesses), Kaliatanda Ponnappa, Nadikerianda Devayya, Keyyondira Appayya, Aiyakovira Appayya and Poledevira Appayya, who were folk heroes of Kodagu. Naana Tharada Vishayagalu, from pages 503 to 556, forms the last section which consists of mainly sayings, proverbs and other matters.

Modern usage

In the past, the village elders knew the traditional laws by heart and passed it on orally over the generations. In recent times the Pattole Palame has acted as a reference for Kodavas who sought the ancient law. One known example was when a couple had to be divorced. The law court referred to the Pattole Palame where they read about the 'Kallu-mara Kaipa' tradition and decided to have them separated (Biddappa 1996: viii). The elders of Kodava couples who marry outside Kodagu or even abroad refer to the Pattole Palame in order to follow the customs faithfully.

Translation

The translators’ introduction explains: "Since the Kodava language does not have a script, he used the Kannada script that has been in vogue since the 17th century, when the Lingayat Rajas ruled Kodagu and Kannada was their court language." His son and daughter-in-law were both teachers. Their daughter Nanjamma and Chinnappa's daughter's son, also called Chinnappa, cross-cousins, got married.

References

External links
Biddappa, Major Puggera P. Nadikerianda Chinnappa (in Kodava thakk), Bangalore, 1996.

Kodava people
Kodava Takk
Indian literature
Kodava literature
Linguistic minorities
Oral tradition
Indian folklore
Indian poetics